The Saqqara Bird is a bird-shaped artifact made of sycamore wood, discovered during the 1898 excavation of the tomb of Pa-di-Imen in Saqqara, Egypt. It has been dated to approximately 200 BCE, and is now housed in the Egyptian Museum in Cairo. Its purpose is not understood because of a lack of period documentation.

Mainstream views
The Saqqara Bird may be a ceremonial object because the falcon, the bird after which the Saqqara Bird is modeled, is the form most commonly used to represent several of the most important gods of Egyptian mythology, most notably the falcon deity Horus and the sun deity Ra Horakhty. Or it may have been a toy for an elite child, or that it could have functioned as a weather vane. Alternatively, it may have been used as a sort of boomerang, as such technology was common and well known in ancient Egypt in the form of a throwing stick used for hunting waterfowl. Another hypothesis is that this bird was positioned on the masthead of sacred boats used during the Opet Festival. Reliefs showing those boats are found in the Temple of Khonsu at Karnak and date to the late New Kingdom.

Fringe views
Some have suggested that the Saqqara Bird may represent evidence that knowledge of the principles of aviation existed many centuries before such are generally believed to have first been discovered. Egyptian physician and dowser Khalil Messiha has speculated that the ancient Egyptians developed the first aircraft.

According to Kevin Desmond writing about the history of airplanes, no evidence has been found suggesting that these claims are true. As a result, the theory that the Saqqara Bird is a model of a flying machine is not accepted by mainstream Egyptologists. Richard P. Hallion notes that it is "far too heavy and unstable itself to fly."  Norman Levitt and Paul R. Gross comment "The evidence? If you build a copy of balsa wood (rather than the original sycamore), and then add a vertical stabilizer (not present in the original) to the tail, you get a so-so version of a toy glider!"

See also
Quimbaya artifacts, a few of which resemble airplanes

References

Sculptures of ancient Egypt
Egyptology
Pseudoarchaeology
Egyptian Museum